Mister Brown or Mr Brown can refer to:

People
 John Brown (servant), Scottish personal attendant and favourite of Queen Victoria for many years
 mrbrown, Lee Kin Mum, a Singaporean blogger
 "Mr. Brown", the code name used by Peter Macari during his extortion of 500,000 dollars from Qantas in March 1971
 A pseudonym of William Makepeace Thackery

Fictional characters
 Mr. Brown, the character played by Quentin Tarantino in Reservoir Dogs
 Deacon Leroy Brown, a character in the TV show Meet the Browns
 Mr Henry Brown, character in the Paddington Bear fictional universe
 Mr Brown/Jeremy Brown, the English teacher in the British show Mind Your Language

Other uses
 Mr. Brown Coffee, a Taiwanese coffee brand
 "Mr. Brown", a song from Styles of Beyond's Megadef
 Mr. Brown (album), an album by Sleepy Brown
 "Mr. Brown" (song), a song by Bob Marley

See also 
 List of people with surname Brown
 Mrs. Brown (disambiguation)